The Santiago Stock Exchange (SSE), founded on November 27, 1893, is Chile's dominant stock exchange, and the third largest stock exchange in Latin America, behind Brazil's BM&F Bovespa, and the Bolsa Mexicana de Valores in Mexico. On December 5, 2014, the Santiago Stock Exchange announced it was joining the United Nations Sustainable Stock Exchanges (SSE) initiative, becoming the 17th Partner Exchange of the initiative.

Operations and indices
The exchange trades in stocks, bonds, investment funds, stock options, futures, gold and silver coins minted by the Banco Central de Chile, and US dollars on Telepregón, its electronic platform. The only floor trading conducted is the share market, concurrent with screen trading. Settlement for shares is T+2. The stock exchange works every day of the week, except weekends and financial holidays. The Board of Directors determines the schedule, and it generally is from 09:30 AM to 04:00 PM in winter and 05:00 in summer.

Indices
Three Stock enhanced stock market indices are published.

The General Stock Price Index (Indice General de Precios de Acciones, or IGPA) is a market capitalization-weighted index that measures price variations of the majority of the exchange's listed stocks, classified by sectors according to its activity and revised annually. The index was developed with a base level of 100 as of December 30, 1980.

The Selective Stock Price Index (Indice de Precios Selectivo de Acciones, or IPSA) is composed of the 40 most heavily traded stocks and revised quarterly.

The Inter-10 Index is a volume weighted index of the 10 main Chilean stocks listed in foreign markets through ADRs; its stocks are selected from the IPSA and is revised quarterly. Futures are traded on the IPSA and the U.S. dollar.

Building 
Like the Club de la Unión, the Edificio Ariztía and the Edificio Ex Hotel Mundial, the building housing the stock exchange was built on land originally owned by the Augustinian nuns. The Iglesia de las Agustinas attests their former presence. The building was completed in 1917.

See also
Bolsa Electrónica de Chile (Santiago Electronic Stock Exchange)
List of stock exchanges
List of American stock exchanges

References

External links

Santiago Stock Exchange
Inter-10 Index Quote at Bloomberg
IPSA Quote at Bloomberg
Market Capitalization Santiago Stock Exchange according to FIAB

Financial services companies established in 1893
1893 establishments in Chile
Economy of Chile
Financial services companies of Chile
National Monuments of Chile
Stock exchanges in South America
Monuments and memorials in Santiago
Economy of Santiago, Chile